Zabawa is a Polish coat of arms. It was used by several szlachta families in the times of the Polish–Lithuanian Commonwealth.

History

Blazon

Notable bearers
Notable bearers of this coat of arms include:
Pełka Kościelecki

Zabawa coat of arms bearers 

Surname: Bruski, Bubelwic, Bubełwic, Drochecki, Dąbrowski, Koczeński, Koczyński, Koczywski, Kościelecki, Piasecki, Pierocki, Pirocki, Pirucki, Sokół, Spiczak Brzeziński, Szwyradzki, Węchadłowski, Włodek, Zabawski, Świradzki, Świraski.

See also
 Polish heraldry
 Heraldry
 Coat of arms

Sources 
 Dynastic Genealogy 
 Ornatowski.com 

Zabawa